Comispira is a genus of sea snails, marine gastropod mollusks in the family Cochlespiridae.

Species
 Comispira compta Kantor, Fedosov & Puillandre, 2018
 Comispira mai (B.-Q. Li & X.-Z. Li, 2008)

References

External links
  Kantor Yu.I., Fedosov A.E. & Puillandre N. (2018). New and unusual deep-water Conoidea revised with shell, radula and DNA characters. Ruthenica. 28(2): 47-82

 
Cochlespiridae
Gastropod genera